Arenibacter catalasegens is a Gram-negative, aerobic, rod-shaped and non-motile bacterium from the genus of Arenibacter which has been isolated from surface sediments from the Southern Indian Ocean.

References 

Flavobacteria
Bacteria described in 2018